The Gifted & Talented series is a book series that has sold more than one million copies.  It contained books for children and their parents.  The first title in the series was Science Questions & Answers: The Human Body.

Publishers
The series was originally published by Lowell House and subsequently by McGraw-Hill/Contemporary. The series was created for Lowell House in 1987 by Susan Amerikaner. It was the first series to use thinking skills in appropriate ways for young children. Many of the original titles are out of print. The series is now distributed by School Specialty Company.

Titles in the series

For parents
How to Develop Your Child's Gifts and Talents During the Elementary Years by RaeLynne P. Rein, Ph.D., and Rachel Rein
How to Develop Your Child's Gifts and Talents in Math by Ronn Yablun
How to Develop Your Child's Gifts and Talents in Writing by Martha Cheney
How to Develop Your Child's Gifts and Talents in Vocabulary by Martha Cheney
How to Develop Your Child's Gifts and Talents in Reading by Martha Cheney
How to Develop Your Child's Musical Gifts and Talents

For children
Reading, Writing, & Math (Grade K, Grade 4) by Tracy Masonis and Larry Martinek
Reading, Writing, & Math (Grade 2, Grade 3) by Tracy Masonis and Vicky Shiotsu
Gifted & Talented Math, Grade 1 by Vicky Shiotsu
Science Questions & Answers: Dinosaurs: For Ages 6–8  by Barbara Saffer, Ph.D.
Science Questions & Answers: The Human Body by Barbara Saffer, Ph.D., and Jack Keely
Science Questions & Answers: The Ocean: For Ages 6–8 by Barbara Saffer, Ph.D., and Kerry Manwaring
Gifted and Talented Puzzles and Games for Reading and Math by Kaye Furlong, Nancy Casolaro, and Leesa Whitten
Reading Puzzles & Games: A Workbook for Ages 6–8 by Martha Cheney
Puzzles & Games for Reading and Math: Book 2 by Martha Cheney
Puzzles & Games for Reading and Math: Book 2: A Workbook for Ages 4–6 by Martha Cheney and Larry Nolte
Math Puzzles & Games: A Workbook for Ages 6–8 by Martha Cheney
Gifted and Talented Reading Workbook by Susan Amerikaner and Leesa Whitten
Math: A Workbook for Ages 6–8 by Nancy Casolaro and Leesa Whitten
Reading: A Workbook for Ages 6–8 by Susan Amerikaner and Leesa Whitten
   Teaching the Gifted & Talented learners - in the mainstream school by Oyesigye Robert Stuart, LAMBERT Academic Publishing)

Series of books